Kanal 5 is the name of a number of television stations whose names translate into English as "Channel 5".

 Kanal 5 (Croatia), a Croatian station
 Kanal 5 (Denmark), a Danish station
 Kanal 5 (North Macedonia), a Macedonian station
 Kanal 5 (Sweden), a Swedish station
 5 Kanal, a Ukrainian station

See also
Channel 5 (disambiguation)